Goldfin tinfoil barb (Hypsibarbus malcolmi) is a species of cyprinid fish that is found in Southeast Asia. It is native to the countries of Cambodia, Laos, Malaysia and Thailand where it is used as a food fish and in the aquarium trade.

malcolmi is named in honour of Malcolm Arthur Smith, an English herpetologist who study reptiles and amphibians in Thailand.

External links 

 

Cyprinid fish of Asia
Fish of the Mekong Basin
Fish of Cambodia
Freshwater fish of Malaysia
Fish of Laos
Fish of Thailand
Fish described in 1945